In a  charter of c.957 AD, King Eadwig ( r.955-959 ) granted twenty hides of land to Abingdon Abbey.

Interpretation of place names :

  " Hengestesige "  ; Hinksey near the  City of Oxford.
  " Seofecanwyrthe "  ; The deserted medieval village of Seacourt near the  City of Oxford.
  " Wihtham "  ; Wytham near the  City of Oxford.

Background

Abingdon Abbey

The  abbey had previously been destroyed by Danes of Viking origin at the beginning of the reign of Alfred the Great (r.871-899).
In about 954  King Eadred appointed Æthelwold as its abbot.

Danes in Oxford

It is known that there had been a population of Danes who had lived in the Oxford area prior to the St. Brice's Day massacre ( AD 1002 ). Many of those had become integrated with the native population and spoke a mix of Old English and Old Danish.
Place name evidence suggests that some of the land granted in the charter had previously been occupied by Danes of Viking origin.
The charter suggests anti Danish sentiment and some purpose of retribution for the previous 
destruction of the abbey.

Interpretation of place names

Hengestesige

This has been interpreted as Hinksey near the City of Oxford.

( Hengeste..sige )

The name element  ' hengeste '  is from Old English  ' hengest '  ( ” stallion, steed, horse, gelding ” ).

The name element  ' sige '  from Old English  ' sige '  ( ” victory, success, triumph ” ).

Toponym

 The place of horse breeding and racing.
 The victory of Hengist and Horsa.
 The success of the Anglo-Saxons.

Seofecanwyrthe

This has been interpreted as the deserted medieval village of Seacourt , near the City of Oxford.
The site is now mostly beneath the Oxford Western By-pass ( A34 ), 

Name corruption

( Seof..fecan..wyrthe )

The element  ' Seof '  is from Old Danish  'sef'  : ( " sedge or rush " ). 

The element  " fecan "  is from Old Saxon  ' fekan '  or Old English  ' fâcen '  
( " deceit, fraud, treachery, sin, evil, wickedness, crime " ).

The element  ' wyrthe '  is from Old English  ' worðig '  : ( ” farm enclosure, homestead enclosure ” ).

 ( Conclusion )

 The middle element " fekan " was not part of the actual name.
 The actual name was probably Seof..wyrthe
 The use of the word " fekan " was a reference to the Danish people who had previously lived there
 The use of the word " fekan " strongly suggests anti Danish sentiment

A possible explanation for the use of the fekan element might have been be to clarify which village was intended, since there were two villages with a similar name.

Seacourt Domesday

There were two villages with similar names recorded in the Domesday Book of 1086 :

 Seuaworde ( Seua..worde ) - now known as Seacourt, Oxfordshire

 Sogoorde ( Sog..oorde ) - now known as Sugworth, near Kennington, Oxfordshire

Name history

In the 10th century a new variation of the name was recorded, that replaced the appendix  'worth'  with the appendix  'court' .

 Seovecurt  : ( Seove..curt ) 10th century

The name element  ' Seove '  is from local dialect seave : ( " sedge, rush " ). 

The village name continued to change and evolve ( with appendix  ' court '  ) : 

 Seove..curt	( 10th century ).
 Seve..curt ( 11th century ).
 Sewe..courte ( 16th century ).
 Sea..court ( 20th century ).	

However the original version of the name ( with appendix  ' worth '  ) continued to be used concurrently, but drifted towards using Old English  ' secg '  : ( " sedge, reed, rush, flag " ).

 Seof..wyrthe  ( c.957 ).
 Seua..worde  ( Domesday 1086 ).
 Sewke..worth  ( 12th century ).	
 Seuek..wrth  ( 12th century ).	
 Sevek..worth ( 13th century ).
 Seck worth  ( 15th century ). 
  Sek..worth  ( 16th century ).

Archaeological evidence

Archaeological excavations at Seacourt 
 
found remains of wooden structures and several ditches that suggest evidence of a farm settlement with ditched animal enclosures and wooden byre's. 
A long and very narrow building was also discovered that was characteristic of a Viking long-house.

Dark red glass beads were found during excavations that had similar features to Viking glass beads found at  York.

Danish origin

The Viking style long-house byre, the Viking glass beads, place name evidence and the anti Danish sentiment found in the charter, all point to the Danish origin of the deserted medieval village of Seacourt , Oxfordshire.

The archaeological evidence suggests that the Danish settlers were pastoral farmer's who continued to practice the traditional method's of summer transhumance farming that were customary in their Scandinavian homeland.

It is envisaged that during the summer months livestock were grazed on summer pasture on the higher uplands of Wytham Woods, while the lower meadows were used for the production of hay.

 My Lady's Seat  is an elevated summer pasture located at the head of the valley known as Wytham Park.
As of Summer 2021 sheep were grazed on  My Lady's Seat  while the lower meadows of Wytham Park 
were used for the production of hay. 
 
It would be expected that the Danish settlers used the land in a similar way, but stayed in summer shielings ( primitive dwellings ) beside the  ' sæter ' , in order to safe guard the animals day and night.

During the winter the livestock were moved back to the farm settlement where they were kept in wooden byre's and fed with hay from the summer hay meadows.

Seacourt toponym

( Seof..wyrthe c.957 ) ; ( Seove..curt 10th century ) 

 Farm settlement with ditched animal enclosure where seave's grow.

 Farm settlement with ditched animal enclosure where rushes grow. 

It is envisaged that man made ditches (rather than hedges ) were used to create animal enclosures, in order to keep
animals safe.
The shallow water was ideal for sedge and  rush to grow, 
which might have been intentional since they have many practical uses.

Types of sedge and rush that prefer shallow water include :

 Sedge family – Cyperaceae.

  Schoenoplectus lacustris .

 Bulrush family – Typhaceae.

  Typha latifolia .

Types of rush that prefer water logged ground include :

 Rush family – Juncaceae

  Juncus effusus .

Wihtham

This has been interpreted as  Wytham Village near the City of Oxford.

Wytham Village is on the lower slopes of Wytham Woods, above the floodplain of the 
River Isis and Seacourt Stream.

( Wiht..ham ) ( c.957 )

The name element  ' Wiht '  is from Old English  ' wiht '  : ( ” weight, land mass, the act of lifting ” ).

The name element  ' ham '  is from Old English  ' hâm '  ( ” dwelling, house, manor, estate, hamlet ” ).

Toponym

 Small village that lifts up from the flood plain
 Small village that rises from the flood plain

Examples of place names with a similar etymology might include :

 Isle of Wight :  The island that lifts up out of the sea

Anglicisation of Old Norse

Many Old Norse words became absorbed into the English language during the Viking Age.

The local dialect word  ' seave '  is an anglicisation of Old Norse  ' sef '  : 
( " sedge or  rush " ). 

The local dialect word  ' saeter '  is borrowed from Old Norse  ' sætr '  : 
( " Upland summer pasture , a shieling or farmstead " ).

Place name examples (seave)

Place name examples in the English Lake District :

  Seathwaite , Borrowdale , Cumbria. 
  Seathwaite , Duddon Valley, Cumbria. 
 Seavy Side, Mosedale, near Haweswater Reservoir, Cumbria.
 Candleseaves Bog, Skiddaw Forest.

Place name examples in England :

 Seamore Tarn, near  High Cup Nick, Cumbria.

 Seavy Rigg, Swindale Beck near  Brough, Cumbria.

 Candleseaves Sike near Rogan's Seat, Swaledale, North Yorkshire.

 Seavy Sike near  Tan Hill, North Yorkshire.

Place name examples (saeter)

The local dialect word saeter is borrowed from Old Norse sætr.

Place name examples in the English Lake District :

 Seat Sandal :  " Sandulfr’s sætr "  or  " Sandal’s summer pasture or shieling " 
 Seatoller ( 'Seat..oller' ) :  " Olafr’s sætr " 
 Seatallan ( 'Seat..allan' ) :  " Aleyn's sætr " 

The name element  ' seat '  is common in North Yorkshire ( for fell summits ), especially in the sheep-farming area's of the Yorkshire Dales , and especially in Swaledale :

 Hugh Seat, Mallerstang , on the border between Cumbria and North Yorkshire. 
 Ravenseat Farm, Whitsun Dale at the head of Swaledale.
 
 Robert's Seat ( near Ravenseat Farm ).
 Alderson Seat ( near Ravenseat Farm ).
 Satron ( sætr..tûn ) (village, side, moor, tarn) near Gunnerside, Swaledale. 
 Rogan's Seat , Northern Dales, Stainmore Gap to Swaledale
 Great Pinseat near Reeth, Northern Dales, Stainmore Gap to Swaledale
 Lovely Seat ( Lunasett ) Northern Dales, Swaledale to Wensleydale

Chronology

Oxford in the Viking age

Timeline for Oxford and Abingdon Abbey in the Viking Age, in the context of other events.

8th century

9th century

10th century

11th century

References

Notes

Citations

Sources

Books

 

Online

Attribution

External links 

Abingdon Abbey Buildings  The Friends of Abingdon Abbey Buildings Trust
St Frideswide : Patron Saint of Oxford  Museum of Oxford

Medieval charters and cartularies of England
957 works
10th-century documents
Anti-Danish sentiment
Anglo-Norse England
Denmark–England relations